Apollodorus mythographus may refer to:
Apollodorus of Athens (born circa 180 BC), Athenian writer.
Apollodorus, the author of the Bibliotheca, sometimes called Pseudo-Apollodorus, to distinguish him from Apollodorus of Athens (above), with whom he was sometimes confused.